Love Is a Game of Poker is the fourteenth studio album by American composer and arranger Nelson Riddle, released in 1962.

Reception

William Ruhlmann reviewed the album for Allmusic and wrote that it seemed "...to have been influenced by Henry Mancini's similar success, leading to a more prominent rhythm section and a jazzier feel than one usually associates with Riddle's charts", and that Riddle's "feel for melody was not extinguished by any means but, probably due to his recent experience, his arrangements and (on three tracks) compositions had a far more cinematic flair, which gave them an early-'60s contemporaneity and brought him out of the '50s just as he was moving on to new challenges".

DJ Spooky, in his 2008 book Sound Unbound: Sampling Digital Music and Culture described Riddle's arrangement of "Witchcraft" on this album as a " brain-tickling juxtaposition of reverberating strings, bells, and chimes".

Track listing

Side 1
 "Playboy's Theme" (Cy Coleman, Carolyn Leigh) – 2:54
 "Alone Too Long" (Dorothy Fields, Arthur Schwartz) – 2:37
 "Queen of Hearts" (Nelson Riddle) – 3:10
 "Red Silk Stockings and Green Perfume" (Bob Hilliard, Sammy Mysels, Dick Sanford) – 3:01
 "Finesse" (Riddle) – 3:30
 "A Game of Poker" (Harold Arlen, Johnny Mercer) – 2:16

Side 2
 "It's So Nice to Have a Man Around the House" (Jack Elliott, Harold Spina) – 2:23
 "Witchcraft" (Coleman, Leigh) – 3:18
 "Two Hearts Wild" (Riddle) – 2:12
 "You Fascinate Me So" (Coleman, Leigh) – 3:13
 "Penny Ante" (Riddle) – 3:00
 "Indiscreet" (Sammy Cahn, Jimmy Van Heusen) – 2:27

Personnel
Nelson Riddle – arranger

Dick Nash - Trombone
Tommy Shepard - Trombone
Jimmy Henderson - Trombone
Shorty Sherock - Trumpet
Cappy Lewis - Trumpet
Don Fagerquist - Trumpet
Ronnie Lang - Saxophone
Buddy Collette - Flute/Saxophone
Wilbur (Willie) Schwartz - Clarinet
Vince De Rosa French Horn
Frank Flynn - Drummer
Ray Sherman - Piano
Joe Comfort - Bass

Re-releases

Pickwick Records

In June 1965, Pickwick Records released seven of the twelve tracks from “Love Is a Game of Poker” in a ten-track album titled “Witchcraft!". Additional tracks came from 1957’s “Hey . . . Let Yourself Go!,”* plus a tune from a 45 rpm single.**

Side 1
”Witchcraft”
”Along Too Long”
”Red Silk Stockings”
”It’s So Nice to Have a Man Around The House”
”You Fascinate Me So”

Side 2
”Playboy’s Theme”
”Indiscreet”
”I Get Along Without You Very Well”*
”Darn That Dream”*
”Blue Safari”**

An album identical to the Pickwick record--even the liner notes--was released on the Sears label.

Alshire Records

In 1971 Alshire Records issued a budget re-release of ten of the twelve tracks from "Love is a Game of Poker," re-titled "Spectacular Brass!!! Fantastic Reeds!!! and the Magnificent 101 Strings with Nelson Riddle." The disc lacked "A Game of Poker" and "You Fascinate Me So."

References

External links
 

1962 albums
Albums arranged by Nelson Riddle
Capitol Records albums
Instrumental albums
Nelson Riddle albums